Dean J. Copely, Jr. (born August 28, 1989) is an American former competitive Ice Dancer. With Charlotte Lichtman, he is the 2011 World Junior Ice Dance Bronze Medalist and 2011 U.S. Junior Ice Dance Champion.

Career 
Dean Copely began skating in 1993. He began as a singles skater and competed at the intermediate level coached by Priscilla Hill for six years. He began training in ice dance at the age of 12 at which time he partnered with Rachel Siegel and competed with her on the juvenile level. He later partnered and competed with Ashley Foy in ice dance. Dean also  competed for a season in juvenile Pair Skating with Meredith Pipkin . Dean qualified for the U.S. Junior Figure Skating Championships in all three disciplines. 

Copely competed at both the Novice and Junior levels with Anastasia Cannuscio until April 2008 when he relocated to Canton, Michigan to train with Igor Shpilband and Marina Zueva known for coaching many North American and European teams to National and Olympic podiums. There he teamed up with Charlotte Lichtman  following the 2008 Lake Placid Ice Dancing Championships. They began competing on the ISU Junior Grand Prix series during the 2009–10 season. 

Lichtman and Copely won Gold and Bronze medals competing in the 2010–2011 ISU Junior Grand Prix series, and qualified for the JGP Final in Beijing, China where they finished 5th. Together they won the Gold in Junior Ice dance at the U.S. Figure Skating Championships in Greensboro, N.C. after which they were featured in the Smucker's Skating Spectacular exhibition show and the RISE Tribute performance (choreographed by Randy Gardner and later included in the USFSA's skating documentary RISE). They went on to win the Bronze medal at the World Junior Figure Skating Championships in Gangneung, South Korea..

Lichtman and Copely announced the amicable end of their partnership on April 27, 2012.  Dean is a graduate of Western Michigan University. He currently coaches at a number of rinks throughout the state of Michigan.

Personal life 
His sister is the former Lithuanian National Ice Dance Champion Katherine Copely.

Programs 
(with Lichtman)

Competitive highlights

Ice dance
(with Cannuscio)

(with Lichtman)

References

External links 

 
 Charlotte Lichtman / Dean Copely at Icenetwork

American male ice dancers
1989 births
Living people
Sportspeople from Fort Myers, Florida
World Junior Figure Skating Championships medalists